Peter J. Haas is an American Reform Judaism rabbi who works as the Abba Hillel Silver Professor of Jewish Studies at Case Western Reserve University.

Haas earned a bachelor's degree in Ancient Near Eastern History from the University of Michigan in 1970. After studying for a M.A.H.L. at Hebrew Union College, he was ordained in 1974. He completed a Ph.D. in Religious Studies and History of Religions (Judaism) from Brown University in 1980. He taught at Vanderbilt University from 1980 to 2000, when he moved to Case as Abba Hillel Silver Professor.

Haas is the author of five books, among which Morality after Auschwitz: The Radical Challenge of the Nazi Ethic (Fortress, 1988, reprinted by Wipf & Stock, 2014) was listed as an outstanding book by Choice and nominated for the Grawemeyer Award in Religion.

Haas was the president of Scholars for Peace in the Middle East in 2010–2011.

References

External links
Home page

Year of birth missing (living people)
Living people
American Reform rabbis
University of Michigan alumni
Hebrew Union College – Jewish Institute of Religion alumni
Brown University alumni
Case Western Reserve University faculty
21st-century American Jews
Vanderbilt University faculty